Coccineorchis is a genus of flowering plants from the orchid family, Orchidaceae. It contains 7 accepted species, native to Mexico, Central America, Colombia, Ecuador and Peru.

Coccineorchis bracteosa (Ames & C.Schweinf.) Garay - Costa Rica, Panama, Nicaragua, Ecuador
Coccineorchis cernua (Lindl.) Garay - Mexico, Central America, Colombia, Ecuador, Peru
Coccineorchis cristata Szlach., Rutk. & Mytnik - Panama
Coccineorchis dressleri Szlach., Rutk. & Mytnik - Panama
Coccineorchis navarrensis (Ames) Garay - Costa Rica, Panama, Nicaragua, Colombia
Coccineorchis standleyi (Ames) Garay - Costa Rica, Panama, Nicaragua, Colombia, Honduras
Coccineorchis warszewicziana Szlach.  - Costa Rica

See also 
 List of Orchidaceae genera

References 

 Pridgeon, A.M., Cribb, P.J., Chase, M.A. & Rasmussen, F. eds. (1999). Genera Orchidacearum 1. Oxford Univ. Press.
 Pridgeon, A.M., Cribb, P.J., Chase, M.A. & Rasmussen, F. eds. (2001). Genera Orchidacearum 2. Oxford Univ. Press.
 Pridgeon, A.M., Cribb, P.J., Chase, M.A. & Rasmussen, F. eds. (2003). Genera Orchidacearum 3. Oxford Univ. Press
 Berg Pana, H. 2005. Handbuch der Orchideen-Namen. Dictionary of Orchid Names. Dizionario dei nomi delle orchidee. Ulmer, Stuttgart

External links 

Cranichideae genera
Spiranthinae